Jerome Mandela Joseph-Pampellone (born 12 July 1996) is an English born, New Zealand raised professional boxer. He participated in the 2019 AIBA World Boxing Championships as an amateur and won three New Zealand national elite championships between 2018 and 2020. Pampellone narrowly missed qualifying for the 2020 Summer Olympics after failing to place at the Olympic Qualification Tournament for 2020 in Asia and Oceania.

In his professional career, he is a New Zealand National Cruiserweight champion and a two division IBF Australasian champion, holding titles in the Cruiserweight and Light Heavyweight division. He is currently ranked 14th in the Light Heavyweight dicision with the IBF.

Early life
Pampellone was born in London. He moved to New Zealand with his family at the age of 10. Pampellone is of Trinidad descent.

Amateur career

Debut, New Zealand National Championship (2016–2018)
Pampellone began his boxing career as a corporate boxer before going into amateur boxing. He competed in his first national championship in 2017, however, lost in the preliminary rounds. At the 2018 New Zealand National Championships, Pampellone went on to fight the winner of the 2017 championships Sunny Teki-Clark in the finals. Pampellone won the fight by Unanimous Decision.

International fights, World Championship tournamament, Olympic Qualification (2019–2021)
In July 2019, Pampellone competed at the Thailand Open International Boxing Tournament. Pampellone won the preliminary rounds against Australian Jack Bowen but lost in the quarter finals against Thailand boxer Saranon Klompan. In Septemember 2019, Pampellone compete at the AIBA World Championships. Pampellone reached the quarter finals before losing to England's Benjamin Whittaker. Despite the World Championship lost, he went on to win his second New Zealand national amateur championship that year and was awarded the prestigious Jameson Belt. Pampellone defeated Colton Seymour-Moir in the finals. Pampellone was selected to be part of the New Zealand Boxing Team. He would attempt to qualify for the olympics at the 2020 Asia & Oceania Boxing Olympic Qualification Tournament. The team had been training in Thailand and Italy. There was fear that the event would be canceled with the COVID-19 pandemic. Pampellone won his first fight in the tournament against Japan boxer Ren Umemura. Unfortunately, Pampellone lost against Bekzad Nurdauletov of Kazakhstan, ending his olympic hopes. Pampellone competed in his last national championships at the Boxing New Zealand 2020 National Championships. The tournament was postponed to January 2021 due to the covid pandemic. Pampellone won the championship against Jeshaiah Perelina.

Professional career

Early career (2020–2021)
Pampellone was successful in his first two professional fights against Thomas Russell on Sky TV and Mandela Ale in 2020. Pampellone had his television return when he fought Antz Amouta on the Joseph Parker vs. Junior Fa undercard in February 2021. Pampellone won by knockout. Pampellone would fight Thomas Russell in a rematch. Pampellone would win by second-round stoppage. He would return quickly to the with a win over Paane Haraki. Pampellone fought Joshua Tai twice, winning on both occasions. First in May and the second on Sky TV in July. After the fight against Joshua Tai, it was announced that Pampellone would fight John Parker for an NZ title. The fight would happen at the ASB Tennis Centre which would be the first time that boxing would be held at the venue. It was announced the fight was scheduled in February 2022. Due to New Zealand going into Lockdown from COVID-19, the event did not end up happening.

International fights (2022) 
Pampellone would make his International professional debut when he took on Lucas Miller in Australia. It was announced that Pampellone signed a long-term deal with promoter Dean Lonergan. Pampellone won the fight by unanimous decision. After the fight, it was announced that Pampellone would take on Nikolas Charalampous in the cruiserweight division. Pampellone who is normally a Light Heavyweight, went up in weight for this fight. Pampellone won the fight by unanimous decision, however, rival John Parker lost on the card, making it less likely for a future fight. In June 2020, it was announced that Pampellone would take on Joshua Francis who is trained by Shane Cameron. A couple of weeks before the fight, promoter Dean Lonergan stated that he was working with IBF to get a regional title on the fight. It is believed that the winner would set themselves up for a world title fight against Jai Opetaia for the  IBF and The Ring World cruiserweight titles. At the event, it was announced that the fight would be for both the IBF Regional title and New Zealand National Cruiserweight title. Pampellone won the fight by sixth round stoppage. In October 2022, Pampellone took on Thailand boxer Thoedsak Sinam. The Thailand boxer put up a very disappointing performance against Pampellone. Pampellone won the fight by Knockout in 80 seconds in the first round by a body shot. A couple of weeks later, Pampellone took on French born Australian Faris Chevalier for the vacant IBF Australasian Light Heavyweight title. Pampellone won the fight by Uanimous Decision, winning almost every round. Pampellone acknowledged his opponent saying it was a hard fight. With this victory, Pampellone is the first boxer to hold the IBF Australasian title in two weight divisions at the same time.

World Ranked (2023) 
In January 2023, Pampellone receive his first world ranking, being ranked 14th in the Light Heavyweight division with the IBF.

Boxing titles

Amateur
New Zealand National Amateur Boxing Championship
2018 New Zealand Light Heavyweight Champion
2019 New Zealand Light Heavyweight Champion
2019 Jameson Belt Most Scientific Senior Male Boxer
2020 New Zealand Light Heavyweight Champion
Central North Island Championships	
 2020 Regional Champion
North Island Golden Gloves Championships
2019 North Island Champion

Professional
Professional Boxing Commission New Zealand
 New Zealand National Cruiserweight Champion
International Boxing Federation
 IBF Australasian Cruiserweight Champion
 IBF Australasian Light Heavyweight Champion

Professional boxing record

Awards
New Zealand Boxing Awards
2019 Amateur Boxer of the year (Nominated)
2020 Male Amateur Boxer of the year (Won)
2021 Boxer of the year (Won)
2021 Male Boxer of the year (Won) 
2022 Male Boxer of the year (Won)

References

External links 

1996 births
Living people
New Zealand professional boxing champions
New Zealand male boxers
Cruiserweight boxers
Light-heavyweight boxers
British emigrants to New Zealand
New Zealand people of Caribbean descent